Colette is a French feminine given name. Notable people with the name include:

 Colette of Corbie (1381–1447), Roman Catholic Saint
 Colette Alliot-Lugaz (born 1947), French soprano
 Colette Appel (born 1986), American pair skater
 Colette Audry (1906–1990), French novelist, screenwriter and critic
 Colette Avital (born 1939), Israeli diplomat and politician
 Colette Baron-Reid (born 1958), Canadian spiritual medium
 Colette Besson (1946–2005), former French athlete
 Colette Bonheur (real name: Colette Chailler, 1927–1966), Quebec singer
 Colette Boky (born 1935), French-Canadian operatic soprano
 Colette Bourgonje (born 1962), Paralympic cross-country skier and athlete
 Colette Brand (born 1967), Swiss freestyle skier and Olympic medallist
 Colette Brosset (1922–2007), French actress, writer and choreographer
 Colette Brown (born 1969), British actress
 Colette Bryce (born 1970), Irish poet
 Colette Burson, American screenwriter
 Colette Caillat (1921–2007), French professor of Sanskrit and comparative grammar
 Colette Capdevielle (born 1958), French politician
 Colette Capriles, Venezuelan academic
 Colette Carr (born 1991), American recording artist, rapper and songwriter
 Colette Deréal (1927–1988), French actress and singer
 Colette Descombes, French film actress
 Colette Doherty, Irish poker player
 Colette Fitzpatrick, Irish news anchor for TV3 Ireland
 Colette Flesch (born 1937), Luxembourgian politician and former fencer
 Colette Giudicelli (born 1943), French politician and a member of the Senate of France
 Colette Gouvion, French journalist and author
 Colette Guillaumin (1934–2017), French sociologist
 Colette Hiller, American actress
 Colette Hume, Welsh education correspondent for BBC Wales Today
 Colette Inez (born 1931), American poet and composer
 Colette de Jouvenel (1913–1981), the daughter of French writer Sidonie-Gabrielle Colette and her second husband, Henri de Jouvenel
 Colette Justine (born 1952), French multimedia artist
 Colette Khoury (born c. 1931), Syrian novelist and poet
 Colette Langlade (born 1956), member of the National Assembly of France
 Colette Le Moal (born 1932), member of the National Assembly of France
 Colette Mann (born 1950), Australian actress
 Colette Marchand (1925–2015), French dancer and actress
 Colette Marino (born 1975), American house music DJ and vocalist
 Colette McSorley, Irish camogie player
 Colette Mélot (born 1947), member of the Senate of France
 Colette Nelson (born 1974), IFBB American professional bodybuilder
 Colette O'Neil (1937–2021), Scott actress
 Colette O'Niel (aka Lady Constance Malleson, 1895–1975), British writer and actress 
 Colette Pechekhonova (born 1980), Russian fashion model
 Colette Peignot (1903–1938), French author
 Colette Renard (1924–2010), French actress and singer
 Colette Revenu (born 1944), French fencer
 Colette Reynaud (1872–1965), French feminist, socialist and pacifist journalist
 Colette Rolland (born 1943), French computer scientist
 Colette Rosambert, French tennis player
 Colette Rossant (born 1932), French-American cookbook author, journalist, translator and restaurateur
 Colette Sénami Agossou Houeto (born 1939), Beninese educator and a feminist poet
 Colette Trudeau (born 1985), Canadian singer and songwriter
 Rocio Colette Acuña Calzada, aka Colettea, Mexican singer and former contestant of La Academia

Fictional characters
 Colette, a characters from Brawl Stars
 Colette Brunel, character in Tales of Symphonia
 Colette Flaherty, character in EastEnders in Ireland
 Colette Green, character in the videogame Half-Life: Decay
 Colette Hankinson, character in Coronation Street
 Colette Tatou, character in the film Ratatouille
 Colette Marchant, from the 2019 movie  Dumbo (2019 film) 
 Colette, one of the Thea Sisters from France in Thea Stilton

See also
 Colette (disambiguation)

French feminine given names
English feminine given names

nl:Colette